The Shirley Englehorn Invitational was a women's professional golf tournament in Idaho for three seasons on the LPGA Tour. It was played from 1966  at the Purple Sage Golf Course, north of Caldwell. Tour player Shirley Englehorn, a Caldwell native, hosted the tournament and won in 1967  Purple Sage was one of the final designs of A.V. Macan.

Winners

References

External links
Purple Sage Golf Course

Former LPGA Tour events
Golf in Idaho
Caldwell, Idaho
History of women in Idaho
1960s in Idaho